In plane geometry, an automedian triangle is a triangle in which the lengths of the three medians (the line segments connecting each vertex to the midpoint of the opposite side) are proportional to the lengths of the three sides, in a different order. The three medians of an automedian triangle may be translated to form the sides of a second triangle that is similar to the first one.

Characterization
The side lengths of an automedian triangle satisfy the formula  or a permutation thereof, analogous to the Pythagorean theorem characterizing right triangles as the triangles satisfying the formula .

Construction from right triangles
For instance, the right triangle with side lengths 5, 12, and 13 can be used to form in this way an automedian triangle with side lengths 13, 17, and 7.

Consequently, using Euler's formula that generates primitive Pythagorean triangles it is possible to generate primitive integer automedian triangles (i.e., with the sides sharing no common factor) as

Then this triangle's medians  are found by using the above expressions for its sides in the general formula for medians:

where the second equation in each case reflects the automedian feature 

From this can be seen the similarity relationships 

There is a primitive integer-sided automedian triangle that is not generated from a right triangle: namely, the equilateral triangle with sides of unit length.

Examples
There are 18 primitive integer automedian triangles, shown here as triples of sides , with :

For example, (26, 34, 14) is not a primitive automedian triple, as it is a multiple of (13, 17, 7) and does not appear above.

Additional properties

If  is the area of the automedian triangle, by Heron's formula 

The Euler line of an automedian triangle is perpendicular to the median to side .

If the medians of an automedian triangle are extended to the circumcircle of the triangle, then the three points  where the extended medians meet the circumcircle form an isosceles triangle. The triangles for which this second triangle  is isosceles are exactly the triangles that are themselves either isosceles or automedian. This property of automedian triangles stands in contrast to the Steiner–Lehmus theorem, according to which the only triangles two of whose angle bisectors have equal length are the isosceles triangles.

Additionally, suppose that  is an automedian triangle, in which vertex  stands opposite the side .

When generating a primitive automedian triangle from a primitive Pythagorean triple using the Euclidean parameters , then  and it follows that . As non-primitive automedian triangles are multiples of their primitives the inequalities of the sides apply to all integer automedian triangles. Equality occurs only for trivial equilateral triangles. Furthermore, because  is always odd, all the sides  have to be odd. This fact allows automedian triples to have sides and perimeter of prime numbers only. For example, (13, 17, 7) has perimeter 37.

Because in a primitive automedian triangle side  is the sum of two squares and equal to the hypotenuse of the generating primitive Pythagorean triple, it is divisible only by primes congruent to 1 (mod 4). Consequently,  must be congruent to 1 (mod 4).

They are also the sum and difference of the legs of a primitive Pythagorean triple. Consequently,  and  must be congruent to ±1 (mod 8).

History
The study of integer squares in arithmetic progression has a long history stretching back to Diophantus and Fibonacci; it is closely connected with congrua, which are the numbers that can be the differences of the squares in such a progression. However, the connection between this problem and automedian triangles is much more recent. The problem of characterizing automedian triangles was posed in the late 19th century in the Educational Times (in French) by Joseph Jean Baptiste Neuberg, and solved there with the formula  by William John Greenstreet.

Special cases
Apart from the trivial cases of equilateral triangles, the triangle with side lengths 17, 13, and 7 is the smallest (by area or perimeter) automedian triangle with integer side lengths.

There is only one automedian right triangle, the triangle with side lengths proportional to 1, the square root of 2, and the square root of 3. This triangle is the second triangle in the spiral of Theodorus. It is the only right triangle in which two of the medians are perpendicular to each other.

See also
median triangle
Integer triangle
Kepler triangle, a right triangle in which the squared edge lengths form a geometric progression instead of an arithmetic progression

References

External links
Automedian Triangles and Magic Squares K. S. Brown's mathpages

Types of triangles